Kokey is an ABS-CBN fantaserye which was premiered on Primetime Bida from August 6, 2007 to November 9, 2007 and was replaced by Princess Sarah. The show is based on the 1997 film with the same title, the planned concept for the show is in continuation to its 10th anniversary of the film, the show last 70 episodes and which was followed by Kokey @ Ako.

Overview

Film

The first Kokey encounter happened twenty years ago. It was in 1997 when we were first introduced to the cute alien who had a penchant for befriending human beings. And his best friend then was the pre-pubescent Carlo Aquino in the movie entitled Kokey. It was directed by the same man who brought Cedie and Sarah, Ang Munting Prinsesa to the big screen---Romy Suzara.

Plot
An alien named Kokey from the planet Yekok had crash-landed on Earth in his ship. He eventually befriends a young orphan named Bong, and he helps Kokey to fix his ship so that he could return to planet Yekok. Kokey also befriends other people - Anna, the sister of Bong, Abie, an aspiring pilot who helped build Kokey's ship, and Peping. Meanwhile, Kokey's enemy, Korokoy, followed him to Earth in order to find a crystal which Kokey values the most. Bong, Anna, Abie & Peping must help Kokey to find the lost crystal, fix his ship in time, and defeat Korokoy. One night, as Kokey & the others were sleeping on a leaf (on their many adventures, they shrank at one point), Bong stayed awake & looked up at the sky, thinking sadly about his friend Kokey & what his life would look like without him (when he leaves for planet Yekok in the distant future). After singing a quite sad song about Kokey, he finally drifts off to sleep. The next day, they continue their search for the crystal. They encountered many mysteries & many problems they had to solve, but eventually they found the crystal & defeated Korokoy. Kokey's mother, Kakay, soon went to Earth to help her son. It turns out that Kokey's father, Kokoy, & Korokoy were enemies too. When they had found the crystal & defeated Korokoy, he said his final words: "I shall come back again!". Then Kokey & Kakay went off to Yekok in their spaceship. Once they were high in the night sky, his mother asked him, "Where's the crystal?" Then Kokey looked around & was alarmed to find out that he left the crystal with Bong! When his mother found out, they both cried, "AAAAAAAAAH!" as the spaceship flew away.

Cast and characters

Main cast 
 Joshua Cadeliña as Bong
 Julia Barretto as Anna
 Ruffa Gutierrez as Trining
 Redford White as Nanding
 Eugene Domingo as Charisse
 Rhap Salazar as Jimboy
 Nova Villa as Sor. Aida
 Joji Lorenzo as Marcial
 Boots Anson-Roa as Doña Ingrid
 Mylene Dizon as Myra
 Ryan Eigenmann as Nicassio / Korokoy

Special participation 
 Sid Lucero as Isidro
 DJ Durano as Dr. DJ
 Jenny Miller as Divina
 Francis Magundayao as Elias

Sequel
On ABS-CBN's Trade Launch for its then-upcoming shows for 2009, a preview was shown for the sequel with the title, "Kokey Returns". In November 2009, Kokey was included in the 21st Advertising Congress as ABS-CBN's then-upcoming 2010 programs. The sequel was retitled Kokey at Ako.

See also
 List of programs aired by ABS-CBN
 List of telenovelas of ABS-CBN

References

External links
Kokey: Teleserye on Demand
Kokey at Telebisyon.net
 

ABS-CBN drama series
2007 Philippine television series debuts
2007 Philippine television series endings
2000s children's television series
Television series by Star Creatives
Filipino-language television shows
Television shows set in the Philippines
Live action television shows based on films